

Newly named plants

Dinosaurs

Publications
Richard Lydekker published a catalogue of reptiles in the British Museum of Natural History, their collection information, and their classification.

Newly named taxa

Birds

New taxa

Plesiosaurs

Newly named plesiosaurs

Pterosaurs

New taxa

Synapsids

Non-mammalian

See also

References